Fredrik Karlström (born 12 January 1998) is a Swedish professional ice hockey forward who is currently playing with the  Dallas Stars of the National Hockey League (NHL). Karlström was drafted by the Stars in the third round, 90th overall, of the 2016 NHL Entry Draft.

Playing career
During the 2018–19 season, Karlström was briefly loaned to his youth club, AIK in the HockeyAllsvenskan (Allsv) on from his SHL club, Linköping HC. Karlström returned after 6 games to finish the season in the SHL with 10 points in 45 games.

Out of contract with Linköping in the off-season, Karlström left to sign a two-year contract with rival club, the Växjö Lakers, on 8 April 2019.

On 2 June 2020, Karlström was signed to a two-year, entry-level contract with the Dallas Stars. It was announced that Karlström would continue his development with the Växjö Lakers on loan from the Stars for the 2020–21 season.

Career statistics

Regular season and playoffs

International

References

External links
 

1998 births
Living people
AIK IF players
Dallas Stars draft picks
Dallas Stars players
Linköping HC players
Ice hockey people from Stockholm
Swedish ice hockey centres
Texas Stars players
Växjö Lakers players